Zygoballus suavis is a species of jumping spider which occurs in Jamaica. The species was first described in 1895 by George and Elizabeth Peckham from specimens collected in Mandeville, Moneague, and Kingston. The type specimens are lost.

References

External links

Zygoballus suavis at Worldwide database of jumping spiders

Salticidae
Spiders of the Caribbean
Spiders described in 1895